Fatih, ex Deepsea Metro II, is a Turkey-flagged sixth generation ultra deepwater drillship owned and operated by the state-owned Turkish Petroleum Corporation (TPAO). She is Turkey's first drillship.

Name
Fatih means "Conqueror" in Turkish.

The three drillships of the state-owned Turkish gas company, Fatih, Yavuz and Kanuni, are named after the most famous conquerors and rulers of the Ottoman Empire: Mehmed I (r. 1444-1446, 1451-1481), Turkish: Fatih Sultan Mehmet, Mehmed the Conqueror, who conquered Constantinople; Selim I (r. 1512-1520), known as Selim the Resolute, Turkish: Yavuz Sultan Selim, who hugely expanded his empire; and Suleiman the Magnificent (r. 1520-1566), known in Turkish as Kanunî Sultan Süleyman ("the Lawgiver"), under whom the empire reached its apex.

History
Fatih was built by Hyundai Heavy Industries in Ulsan, South Korea at a cost of nearly US$ 860 million, and launched on 25 November 2011. Initially named Deepsea Metro II, she was owned by Chloe Marine in Hamilton, Bermuda and was operated by Odfjell Drilling in Bergen, Norway, sailing under a Marshall Islands flag until 2018. In early 2012, she sailed to South Africa to undergo modifications at the DCD-Dorbyl Marine shipyard in Cape Town.

From May 2012, she was active offshore Brazil for Petrobras. The three-year contract valued at  US$ 531 million. In May 2015, the work concluded. The drill was stacked on the Curaçao island, Venezuela because no other orders were received for her service.

In March 2016, she was sold to Chalfont Shipping Ltd. for US$ 210 million.

At the end of 2017, she was purchased by the Türkiye Petrolleri Anonim Ortaklığı (TPAO), a company of the Ministry of Energy and Natural Resources and renamed Fatih ("Conqueror"). Fatih is expected to carry out deepwater drilling for petroleum and natural gas in the Black Sea and Mediterranean Sea. She is Turkey's first drillship. After completing the preparation works, she was commissioned in May 2018 to carry out drilling work in the Mediterranean Sea.

Characteristics

Following her arrival in Turkey, the vessel was equipped with Managed Pressure Drilling system after she was maintained. The drilling works of the vessel are supported by an in-Turkey-developed remotely operated underwater vehicle Kaşif.

Exploration works
The vessel was commissioned on 29 October 2018 for deep-sea drilling at Alanya-1 field in Eastern Mediterranean Sea. Later, she was deployed to Finike-1 field in the same sea.

For drilling in Black Sea, the vessel passed through Bosphorus northwards on  29 May 2020 to Tuna-1 field.

See also
 Yavuz (ex Deepsea Metro I), sister ship and Turkey's second drillship (2018)
 Kanuni (ex Sertao), Turkey's third drillship (2020)
 Abdülhamid Han (ex Cobalt Explorer), Turkey's fourth drillship (2021)

References

Drillships
2011 ships
Ships built by Hyundai Heavy Industries Group
Ships of Turkey
Ministry of Energy and Natural Resources (Turkey)